The 2021 FIM CEV Moto3 Junior World Championship was the tenth CEV Moto3 season and the eight under the FIM.

Calendar 

The calendar was published in November 2020. The round at Barcelona made a return in 2021.

Entry list

Championship standings 

 Scoring system

Points were awarded to the top fifteen finishers. A rider had to finish the race to earn points.

Riders' championship

Constructors' championship

References

External links 
Official website

FIM CEV Moto3 Junior World Championship
CEV
Motorcycle races